Everything Must Go is the ninth studio album by American rock group Steely Dan. It was released on June 10, 2003, by Reprise Records, and was the band's second album following their 20-year studio hiatus spanning 1980 through 2000, when they released Two Against Nature. Everything Must Go is the band's most recent studio album and their last with founding member Walter Becker before his death in 2017.

Background
"Godwhacker" developed from a blasphemous lyric Fagen wrote a few days after his mother died of Alzheimer's. "It's about an elite squad of assassins whose sole assignment is to find a way into heaven and take out God", he later explained. "If the deity actually existed, what sane person wouldn't consider this to be justifiable homicide?"

Reviews

Everything Must Go received mixed reviews upon release. During a concert at Los Angeles' Greek Theatre on July 8, 2011, Donald Fagen said that he felt the album was "underrated".

Releases
Everything Must Go was also released as a DVD-audio disc with a multi-channel mix.

A special two-disc edition of Everything Must Go (one CD, one DVD) was released. The DVD, 'Steely Dan Confessions', follows Becker and Fagen touring Las Vegas after hours in a taxi promoting the album in a special version of the cult HBO cable show Taxicab Confessions, hosted by cabbie Rita.

Track listing
All songs written by Walter Becker and Donald Fagen.

Personnel

Steely Dan
 Donald Fagen – lead vocals (all tracks except 5), organ (3, 5–7), synthesizer (5), piano (3), Hohner Clavinet (9), Fender Rhodes (1, 2, 5–7, 9) & Wurlitzer (1, 4, 8), solo synth (4, 6, 8), percussion (6, 9)
 Walter Becker – bass (all tracks), solo guitar (1–4, 6), lead vocals (5), percussion (9)

Additional musicians
 Ted Baker – piano (1–3, 6, 9), Fender Rhodes (8), Wurlitzer (5)
 Bill Charlap – piano (7), Fender Rhodes (4)
 Jon Herington – guitar (all tracks)
 Hugh McCracken – guitar (all tracks)
 Keith Carlock – drums (all tracks)
 Gordon Gottlieb – percussion (2, 3, 5, 7, 8)
 Ken Hitchcock – clarinet (7)
 Walt Weiskopf – alto saxophone (1), tenor saxophone (2, 5, 7, 9)
 Chris Potter – tenor saxophone (8)
 Roger Rosenberg – baritone saxophone (1, 7)
 Tony Kadleck – trumpet (1)
 Michael Leonhart – trumpet (2, 5, 7, 8)
 Jim Pugh – trombone (1, 7)
 Tawatha Agee – background vocals (4, 5, 9)
 Ada Dyer – background vocals (5)
 Michael Harvey – background vocals (5, 7, 8)
 Carolyn Leonhart – background vocals (2, 3, 5, 6), featured background vocal (7)
 Cindy Mizelle – background vocals (1, 6)
 Catherine Russell – background vocals (1, 4, 5, 6)
 Brenda White-King – background vocals (9)

Production
 Producers: Walter Becker, Donald Fagen
 Engineers: Tom Doherty, Roger Nichols, Dave Russell, Elliot Scheiner
 Assistant engineers: Suzy Barrows, Tom Doherty, Steve Mazur, Keith Nelson, Todd Parker, Matt Scheiner
 Mixing: Elliot Scheiner
 Mixing assistant: Joe Peccerillo
 Mastering: Darcy Proper
 Editing: Larry Alexander
 Arrangers: Walter Becker, Donald Fagen
 Horn arrangements: Donald Fagen
 Technician: Sam Berd
 Drum technician: Art Smith
 Piano tuner: Sam Berd

Charts

References

External links
 Complete lyrics
 Interview with Fagen and Becker in Sound on Sound - Article by Paul Tingen about the making of Everything Must Go

2003 albums
Steely Dan albums
Albums produced by Donald Fagen
Reprise Records albums
Albums produced by Walter Becker